Joel Clifford Dreessen (born July 26, 1982) is a former American football tight end. He was drafted by the New York Jets in the sixth round of the 2005 NFL Draft. He played college football at Colorado State.

Dreessen has also played for the Houston Texans and Denver Broncos.

Early years
Dreessen was born in Ida Grove, Iowa, and graduated from Fort Morgan High School in 2000. In 1999, Fort Morgan was the Colorado 3A State champions. Dreessen was also a member of the all-state team in Colorado that year.

Dreessen attended Colorado State University. He earned first-team all-conference honors in 2002 and 2004, second-team all-conference in 2003 and was a participant in the 2004 Senior Bowl. He was inducted into the Colorado State University Athletics Hall of Fame in 2021.

Professional career

New York Jets
Dreessen was drafted by the New York Jets in the sixth round of the 2005 NFL Draft.

Houston Texans
On October 28, 2007, Joel Dreessen caught his first NFL touchdown pass, a 28-yard reception in the fourth quarter from quarterback Sage Rosenfels against the San Diego Chargers at San Diego's Qualcomm Stadium. It was Houston's only touchdown in a 35-10 loss, and Dreessen was named Houston's top offensive player despite only one reception.  Dreessen re-signed with the Texans in 2009 for a reported three-year, $3.6 million deal.

Near the end of the 2009 season, Dreessen had become the starter at tight end due to the injury of Owen Daniels. Dreessen caught the first touchdown pass in the Texans' last game against the New England Patriots from Matt Schaub.

Denver Broncos
Dreessen signed with the Denver Broncos on March 23, 2012 for three years and $8.5 million. In 2012, he caught 41 receptions as well as 5 touchdowns while playing in 16 games with 15 starts. Dreesen played in 13 games in the 2013 season, recording seven catches and one touchdown.

Dreessen was released by the Broncos on July 22, 2014 after a failed physical.

References

External links
ESPN profile
CBS Denver: Joel Dreessen Thinks Playing For The Broncos Will Take Him To Next Level

1982 births
Living people
People from Ida Grove, Iowa
Players of American football from Colorado
American football tight ends
American football long snappers
Colorado State Rams football players
New York Jets players
Houston Texans players
Denver Broncos players
People from Fort Morgan, Colorado
Ed Block Courage Award recipients